George McLear (21 August 1891 – 26 March 1950) was an Australian rules footballer who played with Richmond in the Victorian Football League (VFL).

Notes

External links 
 
 

1891 births
1950 deaths
Australian rules footballers from Melbourne
Richmond Football Club players
People from Dromana, Victoria